David Owen (born 1938) is a British politician.

David Owen may also refer to:
 
David Owen (author) (born 1955), American journalist and author
David Owen (footballer), English footballer who played for Darwen
David Owen (harpist) (1712–1741), Welsh harpist ("David of the White Rock")
David Owen (judge) (1754–1829), Canadian judge and politician in New Brunswick
David Dale Owen (1807–1860), American geologist
Dave Owen (baseball) (born 1958), American baseball player
Dave Owen (politician) (born 1938), former Lieutenant Governor of Kansas
David Owen (Wisconsin politician) (1828–1893), Wisconsin State Assemblyman
David Lloyd Owen (1917–2001), British World War II soldier and writer
David Owen (Dewi Wyn o Eifion) (1784–1841), Welsh poet and farmer
David Owen (Brutus) (1796–1866), Welsh satirical writer, editor and preacher

See also
David Owens (born 1962), officer in the New South Wales Police Force, Australia
David Owens, character in About Adam
David ab Owen (died 1512), Welsh abbot and bishop